Hope Sandoval & The Warm Inventions are an independent alternative/dream pop band composed of Hope Sandoval from the band Mazzy Star and Colm Ó Cíosóig of My Bloody Valentine. Their first studio album, Bavarian Fruit Bread, was released on October 23, 2001. Alan Browne, from Irish band Dirt Blue Gene, played bass and co-wrote several songs on the album. Through the Devil Softly was released on September 29, 2009, and was recorded with Dirt Blue Gene. Their third album, Until the Hunter, was released on November 4, 2016. Its first single, "Isn't It True", was released on 7" vinyl as part of Record Store Day 2016. A second single, "Let Me Get There" featuring Kurt Vile, was released on September 23.

In a 2016 interview with Consequence of Sound, Ó Cíosóig explained how the musical composition differed from his and Hope's other bands, "It's not that our other bands have restrictions, but there's a certain sound in those bands. Hope and I have a sound, but it's always changing and morphing into different things while still carrying a similar thread."

Discography

Studio albums

EPs

Singles

References

External links
Official website
Official record label website

Irish rock music groups
Dream pop musical groups
Musical groups established in 2001